Leucine-rich repeats and immunoglobulin-like domains protein 1 is a protein that in humans is encoded by the LRIG1 gene.
It encodes a transmembrane protein that has been shown to interact with receptor tyrosine kinases of the EGFR family
and with MET and RET.

Model organisms
			
Model organisms have been used in the study of LRIG1 function. A conditional knockout mouse line, called Lrig1tm1a(EUCOMM)Wtsi was generated as part of the International Knockout Mouse Consortium program — a high-throughput mutagenesis project to generate and distribute animal models of disease to interested scientists.

Male and female animals underwent a standardized phenotypic screen to determine the effects of deletion. Twenty five tests were carried out on homozygous mutant mice and ten significant abnormalities were observed, including decreased body weight and total body fat, scaly skin, abnormal hair shedding, a moderate degree of hearing impairment, vertebral fusion, abnormal plasma chemistry and an increased susceptibility to bacterial infection (with both Salmonella and Citrobacter).

References

Further reading

Genes mutated in mice